The Wildwood Cottage is a historic house on Bancroft Road in Harrisville, New Hampshire.  Built in the 1860s, this -story Greek Revival cottage is one of two surviving houses associated with a small-scale industrial area known as "Mosquitoville".  It was probably the residence of the owners of the sawmill at the site.  The Mosquitoville complex (of which only the two houses survive), was an economically significant part of the town for nearly 100 years, supplying wooden parts to the mills in the center of Harrisville.  This house stylistically resembles some of those built in the village.

The house was listed on the National Register of Historic Places in 1988.

See also
Timothy Bancroft House
National Register of Historic Places listings in Cheshire County, New Hampshire

References

Houses on the National Register of Historic Places in New Hampshire
Greek Revival houses in New Hampshire
Houses completed in 1865
Houses in Harrisville, New Hampshire
National Register of Historic Places in Cheshire County, New Hampshire